King Bell may refer to several Cameroonian rulers:

Henri Lobe Bell
Ndumbe Lobe Bell
Manga Ndumbe Bell (1838–1898)
Rudolf Duala Manga Bell (1873–1914)
Richard Ndumbe Manga Bell
Alexandre Douala Manga Bell (1897–1966)